Life: 100 Photographs that Changed The World  is a book of photographs, that are believed to have pushed towards a change, accumulated by the editors of Life in 2003.

History
The project began with an online question posted on Life'''s website in 2003 and The Digital Journalist: Can photographs create the same historical effect as literature? The question remained on the website for visitors to openly answer to for several weeks. Most responses were in favor of the idea with the exception of a rebuttal from documentary photographer Joshua Haruni who said, "photographs can definitely inspire us, but the written word has the ability to spark the imagination to greater depths than any photograph, whose content is limited to what exists in the frame."Life determined that "a collection of pictures that 'changed the world' is a thing worth contemplating, if only to arrive at some resolution about the influential nature of photography and whether it is limited, vast or in between." Pictures nominated by the public were reviewed by editors who then compiled 100 photographs that they felt portrayed technological photographic achievements, documented historic events and accomplishments or have achieved iconic cultural and, symbolic status. The book was edited by Robert Sullivan and picture editor Barbara Baker Burrows, and published by Time, Inc. Home Entertainment. An updated edition of the book was published August 9, 2011.

Sections
The work is divided into four major chapters and three accompanying subsections.  The major quarters are:
The Arts (concentrating on photography's evolution throughout the 19th century and its later application to cultural exploitation);
Society (documenting images that captured moments that shifted public acquaintance with political, social, cultural and environmental issues);
War (pivotal moments of conflict and associated violence); and
Science and Nature (capturing technological triumphs, defeats and horrors).

The three subsections are:
Photographic Art (early works of artists whose primary medium was photography);
Trick Photography (infamous scams perpetrated through photographs); and
Stop Action (photos that are in fact captures taken from film).

Photographs
Some of the included photos are identified with larger events, such as H.S. Wong's 1937 photograph of a lone child crying at a demolished train station on "Bloody Saturday" as representative of the entire bombing of Shanghai. Other photographs are excerpts from larger historic collections, such as Roger Fenton's and Alexander Gardner's respective groundbreaking documentations of the Crimean War and American Civil War. Margin notes document the circumstantial background of many photographs, as well as instances where the images have been accused of being staged.

Gallery
Some of the photos are depicted below.

References

External links
 A selection from 100 Photographs That Changed the World at The Digital Journalist''

Photographic collections and books
2003 non-fiction books
Life (magazine)